The  principles of the current Constitution of South Australia, also known as the South Australian Constitution, which includes the rules and procedures for the government of the State of South Australia, are set out in the Constitution Act 1934. Its long title is "An Act to provide for the Constitution of the State; and for other purposes". 

The Act provides for certain sections to be altered by the process of a Bill proposing a change passing all readings, approval by a majority of members in both houses of parliament prior to being assented to by the Governor. It also specifies those sections of the South Australian Constitution that must not only pass a majority vote in both Houses but must then be put to the people of South Australia at a referendum.

The first Act to set out the South Australian Constitution was the  Constitution Act 1856, an act of the British Parliament, which was the first Constitution in the Australian colonies to provide universal manhood suffrage.

History

Constitution Act 1856

The Constitution Act 1856, an act of parliament of the then United Kingdom of Great Britain and Ireland under Queen Victoria, created South Australia as a  self-governing colony rather than being governed from Britain. The act, headed "1855–6: No. 2" and followed by the long title "An Act to establish a Constitution for South Australia, and to grant a Civil List to Her Majesty", established the Constitution of the Parliament of the Province of South Australia. It was the first Constitution in the Australian colonies to provide manhood suffrage, that is, all male residents of the colony over 21 years of age could vote in elections.

This Act provided for a bicameral Parliament with full authority to enact laws, apart from a few Acts requiring Royal Assent. The Legislative Council was elected by property owners only, while the 37-member House of Assembly was elected on a broad male franchise.

The adoption of the "one man, one vote" principle removed the ability of voters to vote in any electorate in which they owned property. The Act also defined the rules of tenure for the parliamentarians. The Act was amended by the Constitutional Amendment (Adult Suffrage) Act 1894 to give women the right to both vote and stand for parliament.

Constitution Act 1934
The Constitution Act 1934 (long title "An Act to provide for the Constitution of the State; and for other purposes") repealed a number of older acts, including the 1856 Act and several Constitution Amendment Acts. It has since been amended on many occasions, with the latest amendment  having been published on 4 November 2021.

2013 amendment to recognise Aboriginal peoples
In March 2013 an amendment was introduced to include a statement of recognition of Aboriginal Australians, via the Constitution (Recognition of Aboriginal Peoples) Amendment Act 2013. Wording was included in Part 1 includes:

Description of current Act
As of version Version: 4.11.2021:

The Act's long title remains "An Act to provide for the Constitution of the State; and for other purposes". It includes a statement of recognition of Aboriginal Australians in Part 1, while other parts lay out the constitution of and procedures for the election of the various levels of government in South Australia, and also deals with the tenure of judges.

The Act provides for certain sections to be altered by the process of a Bill proposing a change passing all readings, approval by a majority of members in both houses of parliament prior to being assented to by the Governor. It also specifies those sections of the South Australian Constitution that must not only pass a majority vote in both Houses but must then be put to the people of South Australia at a referendum.

References

External links
Constitution Act 1934 Version: 4.11.2021

South Australia
South Australia law
1934 in Australian law